Harlequin is a Canadian rock band from Winnipeg, Manitoba that formed in 1975.
 The band is best known for the hit singles "I Did It for Love", "Thinking of You", "Superstitious Feeling", and "Innocence".

History
In 1975, Winnipeg bassist Ralph James formed Harlequin upon recruiting vocalist George Belanger, guitarist Glen Willows, keyboardist Gary Golden, and drummer David Budzak. The band began recording demos and travelling to Toronto to perform in the local bars and clubs. It was in one of these small bars in Toronto that Harlequin were discovered by representatives of Jack Douglas, the producer of Aerosmith, John Lennon, and Patti Smith, after they tried to see another band in a larger bar downstairs, but could not gain admittance due to a sell-out crowd. These two individuals later became the producers of the first album, Victim of a Song. They were Lachlan MacFadyen and Kent Dobney.

Douglas helped get Harlequin signed to CBS/Epic Records in 1979, and later that year that band released their first LP, Victim of a Song, which went Gold, and received heavy radio play, particularly in Western Canada. Douglas was listed as the record's executive producer. For the next two albums, Douglas acted as producer. The band's second release, Love Crimes (1980), yielded two hits, "Thinking of You", and "Innocence", Harlequin's biggest hit to date. Harlequin's third album, One False Move (1982), contained two more hits, "Superstitious Feeling" and "I Did It for Love".

For their self-titled fourth studio album, Harlequin replaced Douglas with The Fixx bassist Alfie Agius as their producer. Harlequin (1984) produced only one single, "Take This Heart". The band effectively split after this album but, in 1986, Harlequin released their Greatest Hits album with one new track "(It's) No Mystery". This track was written by David Bendeth and Tom Cochrane, produced by Bendeth, and featured Belanger on lead vocals backed by Randy Booth, Randy Heibert, and some session musicians. In 1986, the line-up was Belanger (vocals), Randy Heibert (guitar), Randy Booth (bass), Igmar Munsch (keys), and Brad Meadmore (drums). The line-up changed almost yearly through the rest of the 1980s until 1987, when the line up of Glen Willows, George Belanger, Nik Rivers, Rob Waite, and M.J. Hutton toured parts of Canada up to 2007. Throughout that period Steve Broadhurst toured with the band as a sub for Rob Waite, and Paul McNair was also a sub for M.J.

In 2004, the band released an album titled Harlequin II. The band was always active; leader George Belanger kept the band active while running another business for 18 years. He then set that enterprise aside and began recording again and released Waking the Jester, in 2007, then a live album, On/Q, in 2009.

In 2006, the band was inducted into the Western Canadian Music Hall of Fame at the Western Canadian Music Awards.

In 2007, Harlequin consisted of guitarist Derrick Gottfried, bassist Nik Rivers, keyboardist Darren Moore, and drummer A.J. Chabidon. This lineup released Waking the Jester (2007), which contained two singles, "Shine On" and "Rise". The band resumed touring and, in 2009, released Harlequin's first live album, Live On/Q.

In 2013, Harlequin consisted of Belanger, guitarist Derrick Gottfried, drummer A.J. Chabidon, keyboard and guitarist Gary Golden, and bassist Paul McNair; and is the current line up touring in 2017. The band continues to tour, mostly within Canada.

Discography

Studio albums

Compilation albums

Live albums

Singles

References

External links
  Official website
 CanConRox bio

Musical groups from Winnipeg
Canadian pop rock music groups
Musical groups established in 1975
1975 establishments in Manitoba